Kathiuska Domínguez (born 1 August 1990) is a Panamanian footballer who plays as a forward. She has been a member of the Panama women's national team.

International career
Domínguez capped for Panama at senior level during the 2013 Central American Games.

See also
 List of Panama women's international footballers

References

1990 births
Living people
Women's association football forwards
Panamanian women's footballers
Panama women's international footballers